Die Pharmazie (English: The Pharmacy) is an academic journal published monthly by Govi-Verlag Pharmazautischer Verlag. The journal includes original papers, reviews, book reviews, and short communications.  Originally published in Berlin by Verlag Dr. W. Saenger in German only from 1946–1972, it is now published at Eschborn in English. 

Publications established in 1946
German-language journals
English-language journals
Pharmacology journals